Cephalia is a genus of picture-winged flies in the family Ulidiidae.

Species
Cephalia flavoscutellata Becker, 1900
Cephalia rufipes Meigen, 1826

References

Ulidiidae
Brachycera genera
Diptera of North America
Taxa named by Johann Wilhelm Meigen